Paparao School commonly known as PPS, is an English medium residential, co-educational private school situated at Koru Uppalapadu in the Prakasam District of Andhra Pradesh in India. The school is Recognized by Board of Secondary Education, Andhra Pradesh.

The school was started in the 1986 by Late Mr. Radha Krishna Murthy, who is the native farmer of the village. The school was named after his brother Late Mr. Paparao. It was started as a three-class (LKG, UKG & Ist Class) institution with approximately 30 Students Day scholar school and Later, classes were added year-on-year. In 1988, the hostel facility was added and converted to a Residential School.

Initially for first 3 batches of Xth Class it was run as an unrecognized private institution and finally is recognized by SSC Board.

The school is affiliated with the Andhra Pradesh State Secondary Education Board and it follows the Andhra Pradesh State Board syllabus.

The school is headed by a Correspondent. The Principal is the academic head of the school. At present, Mr. S Chidipothu is the school Correspondent, and Ms. T Anuradha is the school Principal.

The school has Bus facility for day boarders.

References

Schools in Prakasam district
Educational institutions established in 1986
1986 establishments in Andhra Pradesh